The National Basketball League (NBL) presents a number of annual awards to recognise its teams, players, and coaches for their accomplishments. This does not include the NBL championship trophy, which is given to the winning team of the NBL Grand Final. The award winners are typically voted on by league officials and various sportswriters throughout New Zealand, with award announcements made during the post-season.

Team trophies

Honours

Individual awards

See also

List of National Basketball League (Australia) awards

References

 
awards